Kyle Marshall is a Canadian animator, director, storyboard artist, and character designer, best known for serving as a storyboard artist, supervising director, supervising producer, and co-executive producer on Nickelodeon's The Loud House. He served as a storyboard supervisor until Miguel Puga succeeded him. He later became the head director of the series after Chris Savino was fired for sexual misconduct allegations.

He worked on the show from Canada until moving to Los Angeles in 2015. He previously served as a storyboard artist and character designer on shows like Jimmy Two-Shoes and Grojband. He is also the creator of the YTV show 3 Amigonauts.

Career
He directed several episodes of The Loud House, along with series creator Chris Savino. In October 2017, he replaced Savino as the show's head director, after he was being fired from Nickelodeon for sexual harassment allegations.

Works

Television

References

External links
 

Living people
Canadian animated film directors
Nickelodeon Animation Studio people
Canadian storyboard artists
Year of birth missing (living people)